Xikuangshan Subdistrict is an urban subdistrict in Lengshuijiang, Loudi City, Hunan Province, People's Republic of China.

History
In 2015, Kuangshan Township was merged into Xikuangshan Subdistrict.

Administrative division
The subdistrict is divided into 8 communities, the following areas: Changlongjie Community, Guangrong Community, Lianmeng Community, Qilijiang Community, Qixing Community, Taotang Community, Yanshanhong Community, and Shuangmu Community (长龙界社区、光荣社区、联盟社区、七里江社区、七星社区、陶塘社区、艳山红社区、双木社区).

References

Divisions of Lengshuijiang